Eugen Count Wratislaw von Mittrowitz-Nettolitzky (8 July 1786 in Vlčí Pole (now part of Dolní Bousov), Bohemia – 14 February 1867 in Vienna) was an Austrian and Czech Field Marshal from House Wratislaw of Mitrovic.

He joined the army in 1804 and fought in the 1805–09 and 1813–16 campaigns. He became a Colonel in 1820, a Major General in 1830 and Fieldmarshal-Lieutenant and member of the Hofkriegsrat in 1835.
In 1848 he commanded the first Armeekorps in Italy, and became Cavalry-General in 1849 and Field marshal in 1854. He was Chancellor of the Military Order of Maria Theresa in 1855.

1786 births
1867 deaths
People from Dolní Bousov
Knights Cross of the Military Order of Maria Theresa
19th-century Czech people
19th-century Austrian people
Field marshals of Austria
Knights of the Golden Fleece of Austria
Eugen
Counts of Austria
Bohemian nobility
People of the First Italian War of Independence
Grand Crosses of the Order of Saint Stephen of Hungary